In linguistics, homonyms are words which are either homographs – words that have the same spelling (regardless of pronunciation) – or homophones – words that have the same pronunciation (regardless of spelling) –, or both. Using this definition, the words row (propel with oars), row (a linear arrangement) and row (an argument) are homonyms because they are homographs (though only the first two are homophones): so are the words see (vision) and sea (body of water), because they are homophones (though not homographs).

A more restrictive and technical definition requires that homonyms be simultaneously homographs and homophones – that is to say they have identical spelling and pronunciation, but with different meanings. Examples are the pair stalk (part of a plant) and stalk (follow/harass a person) and the pair left (past tense of leave) and left (opposite of right).  

A distinction is sometimes made between true homonyms, which are unrelated in origin, such as skate (glide on ice) and skate (the fish), and polysemous homonyms, or polysemes, which have a shared origin, such as mouth (of a river) and mouth (of an animal).

The relationship between a set of homonyms is called homonymy, and the associated adjective is homonymous, homonymic, or in latin, equivocal.

The adjective "homonymous" can additionally be used wherever two items share the same name, independent of how closely they are or are not related in terms of their meaning or etymology. For example, the name Ōkami is homonymous with the Japanese term for "wolf" (ōkami).

Etymology
The word homonym comes from the Greek ὁμώνυμος (homonymos), meaning "having the same name",  compounded from ὁμός (homos) 'common, same, similar' and ὄνομα (onoma) 'name'.

Related terms

Several similar linguistic concepts are related to homonymy. These include:

 Homographs (literally "same writing") are usually defined as words that share the same spelling, regardless of how they are pronounced. If they are pronounced the same then they are also homophones (and homonyms) – for example, bark (the sound of a dog) and bark (the skin of a tree). If they are pronounced differently then they are also heteronyms – for example, bow (the front of a ship) and bow (a ranged weapon).
 Homophones (literally "same sound") are usually defined as words that share the same pronunciation, regardless of how they are spelled. If they are spelled the same then they are also homographs (and homonyms); if they are spelled differently then they are also heterographs (literally "different writing"). Homographic examples include rose (flower) and rose (past tense of rise). Heterographic examples include  to, too, two, and there, their, they’re. Due to their similar yet non-identical pronunciation in American English, ladder and latter do not qualify as homophones, but rather synophones.
 Heteronyms (literally "different name") are the subset of homographs (words that share the same spelling) that have different pronunciations (and meanings). Such words include desert (to abandon) and desert (arid region); tear (to rip) and tear (a drop of moisture formed in one eye); row (to argue or an argument) and row (as in to row a boat or a row of seats – a pair of homophones).  Heteronyms are also sometimes called heterophones (literally "different sound").
Polysemes are words with the same spelling and distinct but related meanings.  The distinction between polysemy and homonymy is often subtle and subjective, and not all sources consider polysemous words to be homonyms.  Words such as mouth, meaning either the orifice on one's face, or the opening of a cave or river, are polysemous and may or may not be considered homonyms.
Capitonyms are words that share the same spelling but have different meanings when capitalized (and may or may not have different pronunciations). Such words include polish (make shiny) and Polish (from Poland); march (walk in step) and March (the third month of the Year) and the pair: reading (using a book) and Reading (towns in, among other places, England).

Further examples

A homonym which is both a homophone and a homograph is fluke, meaning:
A fish, and a flatworm.
The end parts of an anchor.
The fins on a whale's tail.
A stroke of luck.
These meanings represent at least three etymologically separate lexemes, but share the one form, fluke.* Fluke is also a capitonym, in that Fluke Corporation (commonly referred to as simply "Fluke") is a manufacturer of industrial testing equipment.

Similarly, a river bank, a savings bank,  a bank of switches, and a bank shot in the game of pool share a common spelling and pronunciation, but differ in meaning.

The words bow and bough are examples where there are two meanings associated with a single pronunciation and spelling (the weapon and the knot); two meanings with two different pronunciations (the knot and the act of bending at the waist), and two distinct meanings sharing the same sound but different spellings (bow, the act of bending at the waist, and bough, the branch of a tree). In addition, it has several related but distinct meanings – a bent line is sometimes called a 'bowed' line, reflecting its similarity to the weapon.  Even according to the most restrictive definitions, various pairs of sounds and meanings of bow, Bow and bough are homonyms, homographs, homophones, heteronyms, heterographs, capitonyms and are polysemous.

bow – a long stick with horse hair that is used to play certain string instruments such as the violin
bow – to bend forward at the waist in respect (e.g. "bow down")
bow – the front of the ship (e.g. "bow and stern")
bow – a kind of tied ribbon (e.g. bow on a present, a bowtie)
bow – to bend outward at the sides (e.g. a "bow-legged" cowboy)
Bow – a district in London
bow – a weapon to shoot projectiles with (e.g. a bow and arrow)

A lime can refer to a fruit or a material. A mold (mould) can refer to a fungus or an industrial cast.

The words there, their, and they're are examples of three words that are of a singular pronunciation, have different spellings and vastly different meanings. These three words are commonly misused (or, alternatively, misspelled).

there – "The bow shot the arrow there," he said as he pointed.
their – "It was their bow and arrow." the Mother said.
they're – They're not going to get to shoot the bow again after puncturing the tire (tyre) on Daddy's car. (Contraction of They and Are.)

The words metal and mettle are polysemes and homophones, but not homographs.

Homonyms in historical linguistics 
Homonymy can lead to communicative conflicts and thus trigger lexical (onomasiological) change. This is known as homonymic conflict.  This leads to a species of informal fallacy of thought and argument called by the latin name equivocation.

See also 

 False friends, words from different languages that appear similar but differ in meaning
 Synonyms, different words with identical or very similar meanings (conceptual inversion of "homonym")
 Riddle
 Word play

Notes

References

Further reading

Types of words